Amity is a residential and commercial neighborhood of the city of New Haven, Connecticut, United States. It is bounded on the northeast by West Rock Ridge, on the south by the Westville neighborhood of New Haven, and on the northwest by  the Flats in the town of Woodbridge, Connecticut. The official New Haven neighborhood planning maps include the traditionally separate neighborhoods of West Hills (vicinity of Valley Street) and Beverly Hills (area between Whalley Avenue and Fountain Street) within the Amity neighborhood.
The neighborhood lies in the glacier-carved valley of the West River.  The river flows in a southerly direction, bisecting the neighborhood.

Three primary routes serve Amity:
 Route 15, also known as the Wilbur Cross Parkway, a limited access highway which has a full interchange numbered as Exit 59 in the neighborhood.
 Route 63 (Amity Road), which runs northwest–southeast, starting in Amity.
 Route 69 (Whalley Avenue), originating in Amity and running north–south parallel to the western flank of West Rock Ridge.

It is the only tunnel on a limited-access highway in the state of Connecticut. When travelling northbound on the Wilbur Cross Parkway approaching toward Exit 59, the roadway descends sharply into the valley, offering a scenic vista of the West Rock Ridge, the twin tubes of the Heroes Tunnel, the City of New Haven to the south, and the glacial valley which opens to the north.

References

Landforms of New Haven County, Connecticut
Neighborhoods in New Haven, Connecticut
Populated places in New Haven County, Connecticut